Municipal de Panguipulli Airport  is an airport serving Panguipulli, a city in the Los Lagos Region of Chile.

The runway length does not include an additional  of grass overrun on the southern end.

See also

Transport in Chile
List of airports in Chile

References

External links
OpenStreetMap - Municipal de Panguipulli Airport
OurAirports - Municipal de Panguipulli Airport
FallingRain - Municipal de Panguipulli Airport

Airports in Chile
Airports in Los Ríos Region